The Firmicute Phage φU53 Holin (φU53 Holin) Family (TC# 1.E.13) consists of putative holins that range in size from 117 to 124 amino acyl residues (aas) in length and exhibit 3 transmembrane segments (TMSs) found in Bacillota phage. While annotated as holins, it appears as though many members of the φU53 holin family are not yet functionally characterized. A representative list of homologues can be found in the Transporter Classification Database.

See also 
 Holin
 Lysin
 Transporter Classification Database

Further reading 
 Chandry, P. S.; Moore, S. C.; Boyce, J. D.; Davidson, B. E.; Hillier, A. J. (1997-10-01). "Analysis of the DNA sequence, gene expression, origin of replication and modular structure of the Lactococcus lactis lytic bacteriophage sk1". Molecular Microbiology 26 (1): 49–64. . .
 Saier, Milton H.; Reddy, Bhaskara L. (2015-01-01). "Holins in Bacteria, Eukaryotes, and Archaea: Multifunctional Xenologues with Potential Biotechnological and Biomedical Applications". Journal of Bacteriology 197(1): 7–17. . . . .
 Wang, I. N.; Smith, D. L.; Young, R. (2000-01-01). "Holins: the protein clocks of bacteriophage infections". Annual Review of Microbiology 54: 799–825. . . .

References 

Protein families
Membrane proteins
Transmembrane proteins
Transmembrane transporters
Transport proteins
Integral membrane proteins
Holins